Czech Republic competed at the 2004 Summer Paralympics in Athens, Greece. The team included 65 athletes, 45 men and 20 women. Competitors from Czech Republic won 31 medals, including 16 gold, 8 silver and 7 bronze to finish 12th in the medal table. Among them was the flag bearer of the Czech team, Roman Musil - the most successful Czech Paralympian at the Sydney games.

Medallists

Sports

Archery

Men

|-
|align=left|Zdenek Sebek
|align=left|Men's individual W1
|643
|3
|colspan=2|Bye
|W 103-94
|L 96-99
|L 96-108
|4
|}

Women

|-
|align=left|Miroslava Cerna
|align=left rowspan=3|Women's individual W1/W2
|552
|5
|
|W 119-117
|L 80-85
|colspan=3|did not advance
|-
|align=left|Lenka Kuncova
|545
|9
|
|L 126-147
|colspan=4|did not advance
|-
|align=left|Marketa Sidkova
|550
|6
|
|W 140-121
|L 85-94
|colspan=3|did not advance
|-
|align=left|Miroslava Cerna Lenka Kuncova Marketa Sidkova
|align=left|Women's teams open
|1647
|3
|colspan=2 
|L 176-201
|colspan=3|did not advance
|}

Athletics
Czech discus thrower Veronika Foltová took the gold, setting a new Paralympic record at 23.47 meters. Martina Kniezková also won a gold medal in the discus throw, setting a new world record in category F51, repeating her triumph at Sydney.

Czech discus thrower František Pürgl initially took fourth place, before being granted the bronze medal after the handicap of the winner Mochtar from Iran was reconsidered and he was moved into other category. Athens was František Pürgl's last Paralympic Games.

Men's track

Men's field

Women's field

Boccia

Cycling
Cyclist Jiří Bouška was the first to garner a medal for the Czech team. He took the bronze medal in the 1 km race. Jiří made a new world record for division 4, but after conversion of coefficients placed third in the race overall. The British competitor Darren Kenny from division 3 took home the gold medal. Jiří Bouška also took the bronze medal in the 3 km pursuit event, with teammate Luboš Jirka coming in just behind him in fourth place.

Cyclist Jiří Ježek won the silver medal in another pursuit event. He had taken the gold medal in Sydney. Jiří has a below-knee amputation. In the finals in category LC2, he could not beat Robert Alcaide from Spain. Jiří also competed in the combination event, and won the gold medal there.

Historically, the first gold medal in timed competition went to the Czech handy-cyclist, Marcel Pipek. He expressed that he had trained very hard to prepare for the race with his friend in Jeseníky.

Men's road

Women's road

Men's track

Women's track

Swimming
Czech swimmers had a successful showing at the games as well. Swimmer Martin Kovář won the 100 meter freestyle competition, taking home the gold medal and setting a new world record. He bested his previous world record that had held for 3 months old, by over 2 seconds. He has now confirmed his absolute sovereignty in the S3 category. Martin also took home the gold in the 200 meter free style event, again setting a world record, despite having to swim the competition from the lane 8.

In category S1, Jiří Kadeřávek won the bronze medal in the 100 meter crawl. He also participated in the rugby union event at the games.

Less than six months after giving birth, Běla Hlaváčková returned to compete in the swimming events and won a gold medal for the 50 meter backstroke Her biggest competitor, Beatrice Hess from France, finished just after her. Kateřina Lišková also participated in this event, placing fourth.

Swimmer Kateřina Coufalová won the next gold medal for the Czech team in the 100 meter breaststroke competition in category SB9. This category is for competitors with an amputated arm. After her triumph in Atlanta, this marked the second gold medal in her career.

Men

Women

Table tennis

Men

Ivan Karabec was disqualified due to excessive use of prohibited solvents on his rackets: he was out of the competition.

Women

Wheelchair tennis

Men

See also
Czech Republic at the Paralympics
Czech Republic at the 2004 Summer Olympics

References 

Nations at the 2004 Summer Paralympics
2004
Summer Paralympics